Rachel Hyde-Harvey (born 21 March 1987) is an English actress and singer, best known for her role as Amy in the CBBC's I Dream alongside S Club 8.

Education
Rachel attended Chaplins Stage School, Northampton. Then she trained at Sylvia Young Theatre School with her I Dream co-star Matt Di Angelo.

Career 
Rachel began her acting career in 1998, when she has played Juliet in the drama Romeo and Juliet. In 2000, she took part in two theater productions, both at Wellingborough Castle Youth Theatre: Road, in the role of Helen, and Haroun and the Sea of Stories. In 2001, she played Abigail in The Crucible at Wellingborough Castle Youth Theatre. Rachel was in the cast of Bad'nuff in London's Soho Theatre, playing Jay. In 2002 she briefly appeared in the music video for Busted's ‘That’s what I go to school for’. In 2004, she played Amy in the hit teen drama I Dream on the BBC. In 2007, Rachel played Margo in My Family and Other Animals at the Jersey Arts Centre/Corfu. From November 2008 to January 2009, Rachel played Belle in Beauty and the Beast at the South Hill Park Hill Arts Centre in Bracknell. From 2008 to 2010, she played Sofia in Sofia's Diary on Bebo and Channel 5. She was an extra in Harry Potter and the Prisoner of Azkaban as an Hogwarts' chorus member. In 2015 she appeared in The Survival Code's "Rat Race" official video.

Music
From a young age, Rachel was the lead vocals for several local rock bands, contributing music and lyrics. She is the lead vocals of a band, called Glitch Code.
Their first album, "Gifted_Damaged", was released worldwide on 12 February 2016 and it's available in two formats, the Limited Edition CD + Book and the Vinyl version.
The first single from the album is "Glimmer". It was released worldwide on 29 August 2016. The official video for the song is on YouTube since 16 June 2016.

Filmography

References

External links
 
 

English actresses
Living people
1987 births
21st-century English singers